The Alexo Formation a stratigraphic unit of Late Devonian (late Frasnian to early Famennian) age. It is present on the western edge of the Western Canada Sedimentary Basin in the central Rocky Mountains and foothills of Alberta. The formation consists primarily of dolomite. It is locally fossiliferous and includes remains of marine animals such as brachiopods and conodonts.

Lithology and thickness

The Alexo Formation was deposited in a marine setting and consists of dolomite, silty and argillaceous dolomite, dolomitic siltstone, and vuggy dolomite.

Distribution and relationship to other units

The Alexo Formation is present in the central Rocky Mountains of Alberta and the adjacent foothills, extending from the Crows Nest Pass area in the south to the North Saskatchewan River in the north. It overlies the Southesk or Mount Hawk Formation, depending on the location. It is overlain by the Palliser Formation.

The Alexo was originally considered to extend as far north as Jasper but was revised by McLaren and Mountjoy in 1962. In the area between the North Saskatchewan River and Jasper, they designated the upper beds of the Alexo as the Sassenach Formation, and the lower beds as part of the upper Southesk Formation.

See also

 List of fossiliferous stratigraphic units in Alberta

References

 

Devonian Alberta
Devonian southern paleotropical deposits
Geologic formations of Alberta
Western Canadian Sedimentary Basin
Frasnian Stage
Dolomite formations
Fossiliferous stratigraphic units of North America
Paleontology in Alberta